Dee Events Center is a multi-purpose indoor arena in the western United States, located on the campus of Weber State University in Ogden, Utah. The circular, 11,592-seat domed arena, similar in design to many of the era, opened  in 1977 and was named for the Lawrence T. Dee family, for his extensive contributions in building the arena.

Description
It is the largest arena in Utah north of Salt Lake City and is home to the Weber State University Wildcats men's and women's basketball teams. It was home to the women's volleyball team until 2006.

The venue has hosted the Big Sky Conference men's basketball tournament ten times: 1979, 1980, 1984, 1995, 1999, 2003, 2007, 2009, 2010, and 2014.  It has hosted first- and second-round NCAA tournament games three times, in 1980, 1986, and 1994, and the West Regionals in 1983, won by eventual national champion North Carolina State under Jim Valvano.

At the end of the 1995–96 season, a new basketball court floor was installed and after the 2005–06 season, a new court surface look was installed. In the summer of 2010, the Jumbotron was replaced by a new Pro-Star Vision Screen scoreboard. It features 4 HD LCD screens, an all LED display around the screens and a Pro-Add LED Display Ring on top. The front panel of the scorer's table is a Pro-Add LED Display. Both the ring and the scorer's table are full-color full-motion LED fascias. Also, added in this upgrade were LED scoreboards behind each basketball standard. Three-sided shot clocks were installed on top of each hoop including the running game time. During the summer of 2012, the court was once again re-surfaced to go along with the new logo also released that summer.

Basketball statistics
 All-Time WSU Men's Basketball Record - 1,024-586
 Overall Record at the Dee Events Center (DEC) - 455-114
 DEC Record - Big Sky Games - 266-63
 Randy Rahe's DEC Record - 137-25
 Rahe's DEC Record - Big Sky Games - 83-12

See also
 List of NCAA Division I basketball arenas

References

External links

 Dee Events Center from the Weber State website
 Weber State Athletics Website

Basketball venues in Utah
College basketball venues in the United States
Weber State Wildcats basketball
Sports venues in Ogden, Utah
Event venues established in 1977
1977 establishments in Utah
Sports venues completed in 1977